Cerro is Spanish for "hill" or "mountain".

Toponyms 

Bolivia
 Cerro Rico, the "Rich Mountain" containing silver ore near Potosi, Bolivia

Brazil
Cerro Branco, a municipality of Rio Grande do Sul
Cerro Grande, Rio Grande do Sul, a municipality of Rio Grande do Sul
Cerro Largo, a municipality of Rio Grande do Sul

Chile
 Cerro de Los Inocentes, in the Juan Fernández Islands

Cuba
 Cerro, Havana, a district (municipio)
Italy
Cerro (Bottanuco), a subdivision of Bottanuco in the province of Bergamo
Cerro al Lambro, in the province of Milano
Cerro al Volturno, in the province of Isernia
Cerro Maggiore, in the province of Milano
Cerro Tanaro, in the province of Asti
Cerro Veronese, in the province of Verona

Mexico
 Cerro Potosí

United States
 Cerro, New Mexico

Uruguay
 Cerro Largo Department
 Villa del Cerro, in Montevideo
 Fortaleza del Cerro, in Montevideo

Football clubs 
 C.A. Cerro, a football club from Montevideo, Uruguay
 Club Cerro Corá, a football club from Asunción, Paraguay
 Cerro Largo F.C., a football club from Melo, Uruguay
 Cerro Porteño, a football club from Asunción, Paraguay
 Club Cerro Porteño, a football club from Presidente Franco, Paraguay

See also

Cero (disambiguation)
Serro, a municipality in Minas Gerais, Brazil 
Cerrito (disambiguation)